The Siberian Turkic or Northeastern Common Turkic languages, are a sub-branch of the Turkic language family. The following table is based upon the classification scheme presented by Lars Johanson (1998).  Two major Turkic languages spoken in Siberia, Siberian Tatar and Southern Altai, are part of the Kipchak subgroup, not the Siberian.

Classification

Alexander Vovin (2017) notes that Tofa and other Siberian Turkic languages, especially Sayan Turkic, have Yeniseian loanwords.

References

 
Agglutinative languages